Gobernador Castello Airport  is an airport serving the Río Negro port city of Viedma in the Río Negro Province of Argentina.

The airport is operated by Aeropuertos Argentina 2000. In 2007 it handled 11,690 passengers. It has a  passenger terminal and parking places for 280 cars.

The Viedma VOR (Ident: VIE) and non-directional beacon (Ident: VIE) are located on the field.

Airlines and destinations

See also

Transport in Argentina
List of airports in Argentina

References

External links 
OpenStreetMap - Gobernador Castello Airport

Aeropuertos Argentina 2000

Airports in Argentina